TreeLine is a free and simple outliner with advanced data element definition and export abilities. It uses a basic tree structure to organize information, and allows the user to define different types of nodes and leaves.

File formats

Export 
TreeLine outlines can be exported as HTML, per-data type user defined formatting.  In addition, it supports exporting outlines as an OpenDocument ODT file, OPML, various delimited text file formats, and as "plain" XML.

Import
TreeLine can open "plain" XML files, displaying the contents as an outline.  It can import browser bookmarks.

File format
TreeLine uses a simple XML syntax to store data, with a .trl extension.

Similar programs
 Zim
 Wixi
 KeepNote
 KJots
 Tomboy
 Notecase
 Gnudiary
 Basket
 GNote
 Tiddlywiki

External links
 Official website

Outliners
2001 software